Coleophora halostachydis is a moth of the family Coleophoridae. It is found in southern Russia and central Asia. It occurs in desert-steppe and desert biotopes.

Adults are on wing from late May to June.

The larvae feed on Halostachys caspica. They feed on the generative organs of their host plant.

References

halostachydis
Moths described in 1994
Moths of Asia